Douglas Maclean Cameron  (born 23 March 1935) was an eminent Anglican bishop in the second half of the 20th century and the very start of the 21st.

Biography 
Born on 23 March  and educated at Edinburgh Theological College  and the University of the South,  he was ordained (after National Service in the RAF) in 1963. He began his career with a curacy at Christ Church, Falkirk after which he was a Missionary  in Papua New Guinea eventually rising to be its Archdeacon. Returning to the UK he was Priest in charge of  St Fillan's, Edinburgh. Incumbencies at  St Hilda's Edinburgh, St Mary's Dalkeith  and St Leonard's Lasswade followed, before his appointment as Dean of Edinburgh in 1991. He was Bishop of Argyll and The Isles from 1993 to 2003.

His brother Bruce Cameron was Bishop of Aberdeen and Orkney from 1992 to 2006.

Notes

1935 births
Living people
Sewanee: The University of the South alumni
Anglican archdeacons in Oceania
Deans of Edinburgh
Bishops of Argyll and The Isles
20th-century Scottish Episcopalian bishops
21st-century Scottish Episcopalian bishops
Alumni of Edinburgh Theological College
Provosts of the Cathedral of The Isles